The Men's time trial of the 2010 UCI Road World Championships cycling event took place on 30 September in Melbourne (Geelong), Australia, the first time in the event's 77 times that it has been held in Australia.

Fabian Cancellara defended his title, and in doing so, clinched a record fourth time trial world championship, recording a time more than a minute faster than any of his rivals. Great Britain's David Millar took silver, with Germany's Tony Martin claiming bronze. The two Australian entrants, Richie Porte and Michael Rogers, came in fourth and fifth respectively in their home country.

Route
The riders completed two laps on an up-and-downhill 22.7 km course for a total length of 45.6 km.

Final classification

References

External links

Men's time trial
UCI Road World Championships – Men's time trial